Katrin Langensiepen (born 10 October 1979) is a German politician of the Alliance 90/The Greens who has been serving as a Member of the European Parliament since the 2019 elections. Langensiepen is the first women Member of the European Parliament with a visible disability.

Political career
Before her election to the European Parliament, Langensiepen had been serving as a member of the City Council of Hannover. Langensiepen has called for reforms to the system of sheltered workshops in Europe, which offer vocational training to people with disabilities. According to Langensiepen "in Germany, we are talking about 300,000 people working in the sheltered workshops for one euro average per hour".#

In parliament, Langensiepen has since been serving on the Committee on Employment and Social Affairs. In 2022, she also joined the Special Committee on the COVID-19 pandemic.  

In addition to her committee assignments, Langensiepen is a member of the European Parliament Intergroup on Children’s Rights, the European Parliament Intergroup on Disability and the European Parliament Intergroup on Cancer.

Other activities

 Heinrich Böll Foundation, Member of the General Assembly
 Nature and Biodiversity Conservation Union (NABU), Member
 German United Services Trade Union (ver.di), Member
 Amnesty International, Member

References

External links

1979 births
Living people
MEPs for Germany 2019–2024
21st-century women MEPs for Germany
Alliance 90/The Greens MEPs